John David Smillie (born February 18, 1953 in Ithaca, New York) is an American mathematician, specializing in dynamical systems.

Biography 
His father, David Smillie, was a professor of psychology.
John Smillie graduated in 1974 with a B.A. in mathematics from New College of Florida. At the university he graduated with an M.S. in 1975 and a Ph.D. in 1977. His Ph.D. thesis Affinely flat manifolds was supervised by Richard Lashof. From 1977 to 1980 Smillie was an instructor at Princeton University. For the academic year 1980–1981 he was at the Institute for Advanced Study. He was a postdoc for the academic year 1981–1982 at the University of California, Berkeley and for the academic year 1982–1983 at City University of New York (CUNY). At CUNY Smillie was an assistant professor from 1983–1986 and an associate professor from 1986–1989. At Cornell University he was a visiting associate professor from 1986 to 1987, an associate professor from 1987 to December 1990, and a full professor from January 1991 to July 2015, when he became an emeritus professor. At Cornell University he was the chair of the mathematics department from 1999 to 2002. In 2013 he became a professor at the University of Warwick. He is married to the mathematician Karen Vogtmann. The couple moved in 2013 to England and settled in Kenilworth.

His research deals with "polygonal billiards and dynamics of flows on Teichmüller space; analysis of algorithms; and diffeomorphisms of surfaces", as well as "translation surfaces and complex dynamics in higher dimensions".

Smillie has held visiting positions at several institutions, including the University of Illinois Chicago, the École normale supérieure de Lyon, the Institut des Hautes Études Scientifiques, the Mathematical Sciences Research Institute in Berkeley, the Research Institute for Mathematical Sciences of Kyoto University, and the Mathematical Institute of the Hausdorff Center for Mathematics in Bonn. He has given talks in the USA, Canada, France, Italy, Israel, Brazil, and China. In 2002 he was an invited speaker at the International Congress of Mathematicians in Beijing.

Selected publications

References

External links 
 

1953 births
Living people
20th-century American mathematicians
21st-century American mathematicians
Dynamical systems theorists
New College of Florida alumni
University of Chicago alumni
City University of New York faculty
Cornell University faculty
Academics of the University of Warwick